Richard Harding Watt (1842–1913) was an English designer who worked with four professional architects to create large houses and associated buildings in the town of Knutsford, Cheshire.

Key

Major works

References
Citations

Sources

Watt, Richard Harding